The International Prize for Arabic Fiction Nadwa is an annual writers' workshop for young writers from the Arab world. Held under the aegis of the International Prize for Arabic Fiction (itself funded by the Emirates Foundation in Abu Dhabi), the nadwa is the first such workshop for Arab writers and has been an annual event since 2009. 

The   ('assembly', 'symposium') benefits from the patronage of the Emirati prince Sheikh Hamdan bin Zayed Al-Nahyan, and takes place at the Qasr Al Sarab resort in Abu Dhabi. 

The small group of emerging writers is accompanied and assisted by two established authors who work as their "mentors". The literary output of the first workshop was collected and published in a volume called Emerging Arab Voices (Saqi Books, London 2011).
 
The coordinator of the nadwa was Dr Peter Clark in 2009 and 2010 and Fleur Montanaro in 2011.

Participants

2009
 Lana Abdel Rahman, Lebanon/Egypt
 Mansour El Souwaim, Sudan
 Mansoura Ez Eldin, Egypt
 Mohammed Hasan Alwan, Saudi Arabia
 Nadia Alkokabani, Yemen
 Kamel Riahi, Tunisia
 Mohamed Salah El Azab, Egypt
 Nasser al-Dhaheri, UAE

Mentors
 Jabbour Douaihy, Lebanon
 Inaam Kachachi, Iraq

2010
 Wajdi al-Ahdal, Yemen
 Mariam Al Saedi, UAE
 Akram Msallam, Palestine
 Rania Mamoun, Sudan
 Anis Arrafai, Morocco
 Lina Hawyana al-Hasan, Syria
 Tareq Emam, Egypt

Mentors:
 Jabbour Douaihy, Lebanon
 Mansoura Ez Eldin, Egypt

2011
 Ali Ghadeer, Iraq
 Jokha al-Harthi, Oman
 Mahmoud al-Rahby, Oman
 Mohamed ould Mohamed Salem, Mauritania
 Muhsin Suleiman, UAE
 Rasha al-Atrash, Lebanon
 Sara Abd al-Wehab al-Drees, Kuwait
 Waleed Abdulla Hashim, Bahrain

Mentors: 
 Mansoura Ez Eldin, Egypt
 Amir Tag Elsir, Sudan

2012
 Huda al-Attas, Yemen
 Sara al-Jarwan, UAE
 Charbel Kattan, Lebanon
 Waleed Ouda, Palestine
 Mohammad Rabie, Egypt
 Ahmed Saadawi, Iraq

Mentors:
 Inaam Kachachi, Iraq
 Amir Tag Elsir, Sudan

2013
 Ayman Otoom (Jordan)
 Hicham Benchchaoui (Morocco)
 Samir Kacimi (Algeria)
 Noha Mahmoud (Egypt)
 Lulwah al-Mansuri (UAE)
 Bushra al-Maqtari (Yemen)
 Abdullah Mohammed Alobaid (Saudi Arabia)
 Nasrin Trabulsi (Syria)

Mentors:
 Mohammed Achaari (Morocco)
 May Menassa (Lebanon)

2019
 Eman Al Yousuf
 Ibrahim Hendal
 Wiam Al Madadi
 Laila Abdullah
 Salha Obeid
 Mamoun Sharaa
 Yasmin Haj
 Hasan Akram

Mentors:
 Muhsin Al-Ramli
 Iman Humaydan

See also
 Beirut 39

References

Arabic literary awards